Justin Simmons may refer to:

 Justin Simmons (baseball) (born 1981), American baseball pitcher
 Justin Simmons (politician), American politician
 Justin Simmons (American football) (born 1993), American football safety
 Justin Simons, Panamanian footballer